The United States Air Force's 18th Wing is the host wing for Kadena Air Base, Okinawa, Japan and is the Air Force's largest combat wing. It is the largest and principal organization in the Pacific Air Forces Fifth Air Force.

The Wing's 18th Operations Group is a successor organization of the 18th Pursuit Group, one of the 15 original combat air groups formed by the Army before World War II.

Mission
The 18th Wing's mission is to defend U.S. and Japanese' mutual interests by providing a responsive staging and operational airbase with integrated, deployable, forward-based airpower. The focus of the unit's operations is directed to accomplishing this mission. Strategy used to employ this mission centers around a composite force of combat-ready fighter, air refueling, airborne warning and control and rescue aircraft as well as medical aircrews tasked with transporting patients by air.

Units
The 18th Wing is composed of five groups each with specific functions. The Operations Group controls all flying and airfield operations. The Maintenance Group performs Aircraft and Aircraft support equipment maintenance. The Mission Support Group has a wide range of responsibilities but a few of its functions are Security, Communications, Personnel Management, Logistics, Services and Contracting support. The Civil Engineer Group provides facilities management, while the Medical Group provides medical and dental care.

 18th Operations Group (Tail Code: ZZ)
18th Aeromedical Evacuation Squadron (Medical Aircrews)
31st Rescue Squadron (Pararescue)
33d Rescue Squadron (HH-60G)
 44th Fighter Squadron "Vampire Bats" (F-15C/D)
 67th Fighter Squadron  "Fighting Cocks" (F-15C/D)
 623d Air Control Squadron "Lightsword" (JADGE)
 909th Air Refueling Squadron "Young Tigers" (KC-135R)
 961st Airborne Air Control Squadron "Ronin/Cowboy" (E-3B/C)
 18th Mission Support Group
18th Contracting Squadron
18th Communications Squadron
18th Force Support Squadron
18th Force Support Squadron Detachment 2 @ Bellows AFS 
18th Logistics Readiness Squadron
18th Security Forces Squadron
 18th Maintenance Group
18th Aircraft Maintenance Squadron
18th Component Maintenance Squadron
18th Equipment Maintenance Squadron
18th Munitions Squadron
718th Aircraft Maintenance Squadron
 18th Medical Group
18th Aerospace Medicine Squadron
18th Dental Squadron
18th Medical Operations Squadron
18th Medical Support Squadron
 18th Civil Engineer Group
18th Civil Engineer Squadron
718th Civil Engineer Squadron

Team Kadena includes associate units from five other Air Force major commands, the Navy, and numerous other Department of Defense agencies and direct reporting units. In addition to the aircraft of the 18th Wing, associate units operate more than 20 permanently assigned, forward-based or deployed aircraft from the base on a daily basis.

Heraldry
The fighting cock emblem, approved in 1931, symbolizes the courage and aggressiveness of a combat organization.

History
 For additional history and lineage, see 18th Operations Group

The 18th Fighter Wing was established on 10 August 1948, and activated four days later at Clark Air Force Base.  On 20 January 1950, the wing was re-designated the 18th Fighter-Bomber Wing.

Korean War

The 18th Fighter-Bomber Wing was reassigned to Korea in July 1950 and entered combat.   Its organization was as follows:

 12th Fighter-Bomber Squadron (F-80C, F-51D, F-86F)
 67th Fighter-Bomber Squadron (F-80C, F-51D, F-86F)
 39th Fighter-Interceptor Squadron (March 1951 – March 1952) (F-51D)
 2 Squadron SAAF, South African Air Force (November 1950 – March 1951, April 1951 – June 1953) (F-51D, F-86F)

At the outbreak of the Korean War, the 18th FBG's 12th FBS provided personnel to form the "Dallas" fighter squadron, which rushed into battle. In late July, the group headquarters with two of its squadrons (12th and 67th FBSs) deployed with F-80s from the Philippines to Taegu AB (K-37), South Korea.

From 28 July to 3 August, the 18th Group operated directly under Fifth Air Force then passed to the control of the 6002nd Fighter (later, Tactical Support) Wing. Pilots exchanged their F-80s for F-51 Mustangs. Combat targets included tanks and armored vehicles, locomotives and trucks, artillery and antiaircraft guns, fuel and ammunition dumps, warehouses and factories, and troop concentrations.

In August, advancing enemy forces and insufficient aircraft parking at Taegu forced the group to move to Japan, but it returned to South Korea the following month to support UN forces in a counteroffensive. Because the front advanced so rapidly, operations from Pusan East (K-9) Air Base soon became impractical, and the group moved in November to Pyongyang East Air Base (K-24), North Korea. The 2nd SAAF Squadron joined the 18th in mid-November.

Maj Louis J. Sebille was posthumously awarded the Medal of Honor for his action on 5 August 1950: although his plane was badly damaged by flak while attacking a concentration of enemy trucks, Maj Sebille continued his strafing passes until he crashed into an armored vehicle.

The Chinese Communist (CCF intervention) caused the group to move twice in as many weeks, first to Suwon AB (K-13), South Korea, then to Chinhae (K-10). From there the 18th FBG continued to support ground forces and carry out armed reconnaissance and interdiction missions. From November 1950 through January 1951, it earned a Distinguished Unit Citation for destroying roughly 2,400 enemy vehicles and severely damaging almost 500 more.

From early 1951 until January 1953, the group and its tactical squadrons, moving from base to base in South Korea, operated separately from the rest of the 18th FBW. The group earned its second Distinguished Unit Citation from 22 April to 8 July 1951, when it flew 6,500 combat sorties while operating from sod, dirt filled, and damaged runways to counter the enemy's 1951 spring offensive.

When in January 1953 the group rejoined the wing at Osan-ni AB (K-55), its squadrons transitioned to F-86 Sabrejets without halting the fight against the enemy. It flew its first F-86 counter air mission on 26 February 1953. In the final days of the war, the 18th FBG attacked dispersed enemy aircraft at Sinuiju and Uiju Airfields.

The group remained in Korea for some time after the armistice.  The wing was reassigned to Kadena Air Base, Okinawa in November 1954.

Cold War
Since November 1954, the 18th Wing under various designations has been the main United States Air Force operational unit at Kadena Air Base.  Over the past 50 years, the 18th has maintained assigned aircraft, crews, and supporting personnel in a high state of readiness for tactical air requirements of Fifth Air Force and the Pacific Air Forces. Known Cold War-Era operational squadrons were:

 12th Fighter-Bomber/Tactical Fighter (12th FBS was at Kadena AFB November 1954 – September 1967) F-86F, F-100D/F, F-105D/F/G
 44th Fighter-Bomber/Tactical Fighter (November 1954 – March 1971) F-86F, F-100D/F F-105D/F
 67th Fighter-Bomber/Tactical Fighter (67th FBS was at Kadena AFB November 1954) – March 1971) F-86F, F-100D/F, F-105D/F

Flying the North American F-86 Sabres, the wing supported tactical fighter operations in Okinawa, as well as in South Korea, Japan, Formosa (later Taiwan), and the Philippines with frequent deployments.  In 1957, the wing upgraded to the North American F-100 Super Sabre and the designation was changed to the 18th Tactical Fighter Wing.   In 1960, a tactical reconnaissance mission was added to the wing with the arrival of the McDonnell RF-101 Voodoo and the 15th Tactical Reconnaissance Squadron (Tail Code: ZZ) The McDonnell Douglas RF-4C Phantom II replaced the RF-101 in the reconnaissance role in 1967.

From 14 – 28 March 1961, the 18th Tactical Fighter Wing deployed the 15th Reconnaissance Squadron to Kung Kuan Air Base, Taiwan equipped with McDonnell RF-101 Voodoo.
Beginning in 1961, the 18th was sending its tactical squadrons frequently to South Vietnam and Thailand, initially with its RF-101 reconnaissance forces, and beginning in 1964 with its tactical fighter forces supporting USAF combat missions in the Vietnam War.  In 1963, the Republic F-105 Thunderchief replaced the Super Sabres.  Known Vietnam-era squadrons of the wing were:

 12th Fighter-Bomber Squadron (Tail Code: ZA, ZZ) (September 1967 – June 1972) (F-105D/F)
 Det 1, 12th Tactical Fighter Squadron (Tail Code: ZB) (F-105F/G)(Deployed at Korat RTAFB, Thailand, September–November 1970.  Redesignated as 6010 Wild Weasel Squadron and reassigned to 388th TFW)
 44th Fighter-Bomber Squadron (Tail Code: ZL, ZZ) (March 1971 – December 1972) (F-4C)
 67th Fighter-Bomber Squadron (Tail Code: ZG, ZZ) (March 1971 – October 1973) (F-4C)

The deployments to Southeast Asia continued until the end of United States involvement in the conflict.  An electronic warfare capability was added to the wing in late 1968 with the reassignment of the 19th Tactical Electronic Warfare Squadron  from Shaw AFB, South Carolina flying the Douglas EB-66E Destroyer (Tail Code: ZT). The B-66s remained until 1970, flying daily over the skies of Southeast Asia.

During the 1968 Pueblo crisis, the 18th deployed between January and June to Osan Air Base, South Korea following the North Korean seizure of the vessel. Frequent deployments to South Korea have been performed ever since to maintain the air defense alert mission there. The McDonnell Douglas F-4C/D Phantom II replaced the F-105s in 1971, and a further upgrade to the McDonnell Douglas F-15 Eagle was made in 1979.

On 6 November 1972, the 18th Wing dispatched the McDonnell Douglas F-4C/D Phantom II fighters of 44th Tactical Fighter Squadron and 67th Tactical Fighter Squadron to the Ching Chuan Kang Air Base in Taiwan until 31 May 1975, to assist Taiwan ’s air defense, defend against aerial threats from China.

The following are the units that the 18th Tactical Fighter Wing once stationed at Ching Chuan Kang Air Base in Taiwan：

 44th Tactical Fighter Squadron (Tail Code: ZL) 
(6 November 1972 – 10 April 1975) (F-4C/D)
 67th Tactical Fighter Squadron (Tail Code: ZG) 
(6 November 1972 – 31 May 1975) (EF-4C, F-4C)

In May 1971, the 556th RS was also transferred from Yokota to Kadena with Martin EB-57E Canberra aircraft (Tail Code: GT) to the wing. It inactivated in 1973. In 1972, the 1st Special Operations Squadron was assigned, bringing their specialized C-130E-I. (Combat Talon) The RF-4C reconnaissance mission ended in 1989 with the transfer of the RF-4Cs to the 460th TRG at Taegu AB in Korea.

Post Vietnam-era squadrons have been:

 12th Tactical Fighter (June 1972 – May 1978, February 1981 – October 1991)F-4D (June 1972 – July 1979), F-15C/D (July 1979 – October 1991) (Tail Code: ZZ)
 44th Tactical Fighter (December 1972 – May 1978, February 1981 – October 1991)F-4C (October 1973 – June 1975), F-4D (June 1975 – July 1979), F-15C/D (July 1979 – October 1991) (Tail Code: ZZ)
 67th Tactical Fighter (October 1973 – May 1978, February 1981 – October 1991)F-4C (October 1973 – September 1980) (Tail Code: ZZ), F-15C/D (July 1979 – October 1991) (Tail Code: ZZ)

Modern era
The designation of the wing changed on 1 October 1991, to the 18th Wing with the implementation of the Objective Wing concept. The original designation, as determined by the then Wing Commander, Brigadier General Joseph Hurd, was 18 Wing; meant to mirror the numbering convention of the Royal Air Force. This was quickly changed however when it was disapproved by PACAF but there are coins, etc. from this time period that depict the wing's designation as 18 Wing.

With the objective wing, the mission of the 18th expanded to the Composite Air Wing concept of multiple different wing missions with different aircraft.   The mission of the 18th was expanded to include aerial refueling with Boeing KC-135R/T Stratotanker tanker aircraft (909th ARS); and surveillance, warning, command and control Boeing E-3B/C Sentry (961st AACS), and communications. Added airlift mission in June 1992 with the Beech C-12 Huron, transporting mission critical personnel, high-priority cargo and distinguished visitors.

In February 1993, the 18th Wing gained responsibility for coordinating rescue operations in the Western Pacific and Indian Ocean with the addition of the 33d Rescue Squadron (33d RQS).

In November 1999, the 18th Wing underwent another change as one of its three F-15 units, the 12th Fighter Squadron, was reassigned to the 3d Wing at Elmendorf Air Force Base, Alaska.

In 2003 the 374th Aeromedical Evacuation Squadron at Yokota Air Base, Japan was moved to Kadena and redesignated the 18th AES giving the 18th Wing an added mission of patient transport. 18 AES crews utilize the KC-135s of the 909th ARS as well as other opportune aircraft including the C-17 and C-130.

Between 24–31 March 2006, during Foal Eagle 2006 exercises, aircraft from the 18th Wing teamed with the U.S. Navy's Strike Fighter Squadron 151 (VFA-151) from Carrier Air Wing Two (CVW-2) to provide combat air patrols and coordinated bombing runs via the exercise's Combined Air Operations Center.

The 18th Wing has earned many honors over the years, including 17 Air Force Outstanding Unit Awards.

Lineage
 Established as 18th Fighter Wing on 10 August 1948
 Activated on 14 August 1948
 Redesignated: 18th Fighter-Bomber Wing on 20 January 1950
 Redesignated: 18th Tactical Fighter Wing on 1 July 1958
 Redesignated: 18th Wing on 1 October 1991

Assignments

 Thirteenth Air Force, 14 August 1948
 Far East Air Forces, 1 December 1948
 Thirteenth Air Force, 16 May 1949
 Attached to: Fifth Air Force, 1 December 1950 – 31 October 1954
 Attached to: Twentieth Air Force, 1 November 1954
 Attached to: 6332nd Air Base Wing, 1–9 November 1954
 Attached to: Twentieth Air Force, 10 November 1954 – 31 January 1955
 Attached to: Air Task Group Fifth, Provisional, 1–15 February 1955
 Attached to: Twentieth Air Force, 16–28 February 1955
 Attached to: 313th Air Division, 1 March 1955 – 31 January 1957
 Attached to: Fifth Air Force, 1 February-30 September 1957
 Attached to: 327th Air Division, 6 November 1972 – 31 May 1975

 Fifth Air Force, 1 October 1957
 313th Air Division, 10 November 1958
 Attached to: Fifth Air Force ADVON, 28 January-13 June 1968
 Fifth Air Force, 1 October 1991–present

Components
Groups
 5 Reconnaissance: attached 1 December 1948 – 16 May 1949
 18 Fighter (later, 18 Fighter-Bomber; 18 Tactical Fighter; 18 Operations): 14 August 1948 – 1 October 1957 (detached 16 May-16 December 1949, 28 July-30 November 1950, 1–9 November 1954, and 3-c. 30 September 1955); 1 May 1978 – 11 February 1981; 1 October 1991–present
 35 Fighter-Interceptor: attached 7–24 May 1951.

Squadrons
 1 Special Operations: 15 December 1972 – 1 May 1978
 12 Fighter-Bomber (later, 12 Tactical Fighter): attached 15 March-15 August 1957; assigned 25 March 1958 – 1 May 1978 (detached 1 February-15 March 1965, 15 June-25 August 1965, 23–29 January 1968); assigned 11 February 1981 – 1 October 1991
 13 Tactical Fighter: 15 May 1966 – 15 November 1967 (detached)
 15th Tactical Reconnaissance Squadron: attached 15 March 1960 – 19 April 1970, assigned 20 April 1970 – 1 May 1978; assigned 11 February 1981 – 1 October 1989
 19 Tactical Electronic Warfare: 31 December 1968 – 31 October 1970 (detached 31 December 1968 – 10 May 1969)
 21 Troop Carrier: attached 17 February-28 June 1950
 25 Liaison: attached 1 December 1948 – 25 March 1949
 25 Tactical Fighter: 19 December 1975 – 1 May 1978
 26 Aggressor: 1 October 1988 – 21 February 1990
 39 Fighter-Interceptor: attached 25 May 1951 – 31 May 1952
 44 Fighter-Bomber (later, 44 Tactical Fighter): attached 25 July-30 November 1950; attached 1 February-30 September 1957, assigned 1 October 1957 – 25 April 1967; assigned 15 March 1971 – 1 May 1978; assigned 11 February 1981 – 1 October 1991
 67 Fighter-Bomber (later, 67 Tactical Fighter): attached 1 February-30 September 1957, assigned 1 October 1957 – 15 December 1967; assigned 15 March 1971 – 1 May 1978; assigned 11 February 1981 – 1 October 1991
 90 Special Operations: 15 April-15 December 1972
 306 Tactical Fighter: attached 24 April-17 July 1962
 307 Tactical Fighter: attached 21 December 1962 – March 1963
 308 Tactical Fighter: attached March–July 1963
 309 Tactical Fighter: attached 17 July-21 December 1962
 336 Fighter-Day: attached 7 August 1956 – 1 February 1957
 6200 Troop Carrier: attached 1 December 1948 – 16 May 1949
 Flying Training Squadron, Provisional: attached 15 October 1957 – 25 March 1958

 Flights
 3d Direct Air Support Flight, 8 October 1964 – 15 September 1968

Stations
 Clark AFB, Philippines, 14 August 1948
 Pusan East AB (K-9), South Korea, 1 December 1950
 Pyongyang East Airfield (K-24), North Korea, 1 December 1950
 Suwon AB (K-13), South Korea, 4 December 1950
 Chinhae Airfield (K-10), South Korea, 10 December 1950
 Osan-ni Airfield (K-55), South Korea, 26 December 1952
 Ching Chuan Kang Air Base, Taichung, Taiwan, 14 July  1960
 Kadena AB, Okinawa (later, Japan), 1 November 1954–present

Aircraft

 P (later, F)-47, 1948
 F-51, 1948–1950, 1950–1953
 RB-17, 1948–1949, 1949–1950; VB-17, 1948–1949
 F-2, 1948–1949
 C-47, 1948–1949
 C-46, 1949
 RC-45, 1949–1950
 F-80, 1949–1950
 F-86, 1953–1955, 1955, 1955–1957

 T-33, 1954
 F-100, 1957–1963
 F-105, 1962–1965, 1965–1968, 1968–1972
 RF-101, 1960–1967
 RF-4, 1967–1989; F-4, 1971–1980
 C-130 (later, MC-130), 1972–1981
 T-39, 1975–1976; CT-39, 1977–1984
 F-15, 1979–present
 KC-135, 1991–present
 E-3, 1991–present
 HH-60, 1993–present

List of commanders

References

This article contains information from the 18th Wing history factsheet which is an official document of the United States Government and is presumed to be in the public domain.

External links

 18th Wing’s Official Website

0018